Persatuan Sepakbola Mojokerto (simply known as Persem Mojokerto) is an Indonesian football club based in Mojokerto, East Java. They currently compete in the Liga 3.

Honours
 Liga Indonesia Third Division
 Champion: 2007

References

External links

Mojokerto
Sport in East Java
Football clubs in Indonesia
Football clubs in East Java
Association football clubs established in 1931
1931 establishments in the Dutch East Indies